This is a list of the award history of the gospel duo, Mary Mary. The duo have won a total of 78 awards out of 92 nominations

Awards 

Mary Mary
Awards